Shoal Bay is the most eastern suburb of the Port Stephens local government area in the Hunter Region of New South Wales, Australia. It is located on the southern shore of Port Stephens, adjacent to the bay of the same name at the entrance to the port. It includes part of Tomaree National Park within its boundaries and, like other suburbs around Port Stephens, is a popular tourist destination, especially in summer months. At the 2021 census the town of Shoal Bay had a population of 1,815 but the population increases significantly during tourist season.

Heritage listings
Shoal Bay has a number of heritage-listed sites, including:
 2 Shoal Bay Road: Tomaree Head Fortifications
 Shoalhaven Road: Tomaree Holiday Lodge

History 
The Worimi people are the traditional owners of the Port Stephens area

Notes

References

External links 

 
 

Suburbs of Port Stephens Council
Bays of New South Wales
Beaches of New South Wales